Charles Heberling (April 28, 1925 – December 9, 2019) was an American football official in the National Football League (NFL) and Western Pennsylvania sports administrator. He was the referee for both the Hail Mary Game and The Drive. He was an alternate for the officiating crew for Super Bowl XXI.  Heberling wore the number 46 for the major part of his NFL career.

Upon his inauguration into the Washington & Jefferson College Hall of Fame, his alma mater described him as "the man who has had the greatest impact on high school athletics in western Pennsylvania in the 100-year history."

Early life and education 
A native of Pittsburgh, Heberling attended Perry High School in the North Side neighborhood.  He attended Washington & Jefferson College, graduating in 1949.  There, he was a multi-sport athlete, letting three times in football, where he was a played running back alongside Melvin Bassi, Walter Cooper and "Deacon" Dan Towler, and three times in baseball, where he was a top starting pitcher.  During World War II, he served as a fighter pilot in the United States Navy; it was there that he earned the nickname "Ace."  Later, he worked as a teacher and coach of the football and basketball at East Washington High School.  He also worked as a salesman for General Electric in Pittsburgh.

During the 1970s, Heberling was a school board member for the North Allegheny School District.

Career

Officiating
Heberling worked as a football official in high school and college football for 15 years and basketball for 25 years. He spent 23 years as an official in the National Football League, 16 years of which he spent as a crew chief.  He spent another 14 years as an NFL observer.  He was the referee for The Drive, one of the most famous events in professional football.  Later, he was an alternate on the officiating crew for Super Bowl XIII and Super Bowl XXI.  He was the replay official for Super Bowl XXIII.

Leadership of WPIAL
In 1976, Heberling took over as executive director of the Western Pennsylvania Interscholastic Athletic League (WPIAL), which held supervisory control over scholastic sports in Western Pennsylvania.  Under his leadership WPIAL grew from an organization being run from a basement into a well-respected and fiscally solvent sports organization, with a permanent headquarters, equality among the male and female sports, and a lucrative contract bringing the WPIAL high school football championship to cable television.  He was a capable and headstrong executive, leading the Pittsburgh Post-Gazette to say that he "...took a hard stand on many WPIAL issues and ran the league with a certain boldness that infuriated some school officials, coaches and members of the media."  In 1986, he successfully secured the use of Three Rivers Stadium, and later Heinz Field, as the site of the WPIAL championships for all classes of WPIAL football.  He retired from the WPIAL on June 30, 1998 after 22 years.

Personal life 
Heberling and his wife Jane had four children, three sons and a daughter. He died at his home in McCandless, Pennsylvania on December 9, 2019 at the age of 94.
Heberling was preceded in death by his wife of 65 years, Jane, and his son Daniel. He is survived by two sons, a daughter, nine grandchildren and four great-grandchildren.

Notes

References

1925 births
2019 deaths
Basketball referees
College football officials
National Football League officials
Washington & Jefferson Presidents football players
Washington & Jefferson Presidents baseball players
United States Navy pilots of World War II
Military personnel from Pittsburgh
Sportspeople from Pittsburgh
Schoolteachers from Pennsylvania
Baseball players from Pennsylvania
Players of American football from Pittsburgh
School board members in Pennsylvania
Businesspeople from Pittsburgh
20th-century American businesspeople